Mainard Larkin (better known by their stage names Randa and Larz Randa) is a rapper and recording artist.

Randa is best known for their song "Rangers", which is used on a TV health promotion ad in New Zealand called "Go the distance". The video was a marketing campaign that aimed to contribute to changing New Zealanders alcohol consumption behaviour from the current norm of high-risk drinking to one of moderation. One of biggest moments of Randa's career was performing at the Auckland Big Day Out 2014.

Randa identifies as transgender and non-binary.

Air New Zealand
In 2018, Randa was featured on an Air New Zealand safety video alongside Julian Dennison, Kings and Theia. In the video, the New Zealand musicians were rapping and singing to a song they created called "It's Kiwi Safety". The music adapts two songs, Run-DMC's It's Tricky and In the Neighbourhood by Sisters Underground. The video took nine days to record, shooting all across New Zealand. It is the 18th of Air New Zealand's safety videos, which started in 2009. The video was dumped by Air New Zealand after only three months due to public criticism.

Personal life
Randa was educated at Carmel College, Auckland, for their high school years. Randa started making music while living briefly in Sydney, Australia, in 2011. Randa studied at MAINZ which is a program part of Tai Poutini Polytechnic.

Nominations and awards
 2013 RIANZ New Zealand Music Awards – Best Music Video - Frankenstein (Nominated)
 2014 RIANZ New Zealand Music Awards – Critics’ Choice prize (Winner)
 2019 RIANZ New Zealand Music Awards – Best Music Video - Rock Bottom (Winner)

Discography

EPs

Single

Featured artist

Music videos

References

New Zealand musicians
Musicians from Auckland
Living people
1993 births
People with non-binary gender identities
Transgender musicians
New Zealand LGBT musicians
LGBT rappers
People educated at Carmel College, Auckland
Transgender non-binary people